Michael Howard (19 September 1933 – 17 February 2009) was an Irish Fine Gael party politician who served in Seanad Éireann for nearly 20 years.

An unsuccessful candidate at the 1969 and 1973 general elections, he was first elected to Seanad Éireann in 1977 by the Industrial and Commercial Panel, he served until 1987 (in the 15th, 16th, and 17th Seanads) and again from 1989 to 1997 (in the 19th and 20th Seanads), in each case being returned by the Industrial and Commercial Panel. He lost his seat at the 1997 Seanad election. He was an associate member of the British–Irish Parliamentary Assembly in 1997.

Born in Lisdoonvarna, County Clare, he was a publican and farmer. He was also a member of Clare County Council and a president of the Vintners' Federation of Ireland.

References

1933 births
2009 deaths
Fine Gael senators
Members of the 14th Seanad
Members of the 15th Seanad
Members of the 16th Seanad
Members of the 17th Seanad
Members of the 19th Seanad
Members of the 20th Seanad
Irish farmers
Politicians from County Clare